Alfred Joseph Callick (14 August 1925 – 3 January 2021) was an Australian rules footballer who played with South Melbourne in the Victorian Football League (VFL).

Callick, a South Melbourne Colts player, was used by South Melbourne as a ruckman and defender. He made his debut in South Melbourne's win over Footscray at Princes Park in the 1943 VFL season, then didn't reappear until 1946, due to war service.

After leaving South Melbourne, Callick played for Traralgon and was club coach for the 1954 Latrobe Valley Football League season.

References

External links

1925 births
2021 deaths
Australian rules footballers from Victoria (Australia)
Sydney Swans players
Traralgon Football Club coaches
Traralgon Football Club players